Russian–Georgian war may refer to:
 Red Army invasion of Georgia, 1921, also known as the Soviet—Georgian War
 2008 South Ossetia War, also known as the Russia–Georgia War

Eurasian history